Nebria gyllenhali is a black-coloured species of ground beetle in the Nebriinae subfamily that can be found in Canada, Iceland, Latvia, Russia, and the United States.

References

gyllenhali
Beetles described in 1806
Beetles of Europe
Beetles of North America